Hopo Station is a station on the Busan Metro Line 2 located in Dong-myeon, Yangsan, South Gyeongsang.

Its old name is Hopo(狐浦), and it is the natural village name of the port along the Nakdong River.

It is located at the point where Yangsan Stream joins the Nakdong River.

Facilities near the station 

 Hopo Village

 Hopo Saemaeul

 Hopo Vehicle Office

 Yangsan oxide terminal
BTC Academy (formerly Busan Transportation Corporation Training Institute)
Mulguem IC

External links 
 Cyber station information from Busan Transportation Corporation

Reference 

Railway stations in South Korea opened in 1999
Metro stations in Yangsan